Blairs is a census-designated place (CDP) in Pittsylvania County, Virginia, United States. The population as of the 2010 Census was 916.

Chatham-Blairs is also the name of a political district in south-central Pittsylvania County, Virginia.

Notable people
Wally Burnette, professional baseball player.

References
Virginia Trend Report 2: State and Complete Places (Sub-state 2010 Census Data)

Unincorporated communities in Virginia
Census-designated places in Pittsylvania County, Virginia
Census-designated places in Virginia